Diwân 2 is the seventh studio album by French–Algerian Raï singer Rachid Taha. It was released by Wrasse Records on 16 October 2006. The album is a follow-up to Diwân (1998) and primarily features cover versions of songs recorded by Blaoui Houari and Mohamed Mazouni.

The album features the Egyptian percussionist Hossam Ramzy and the Cairo String Ensemble.

A video clip was made for "Écoute Moi Camarade".

Track listing
 "Écoute Moi Camarade"
 "Rani M'Hayer"
 "Agatha"
 "Kifache Rah"
 "Josephine"
 "Gana El Hawa"
 "Aah Mon Amour"
 "Mataouel Delil"
 "Maydoum"
 "Ghanny Li Shwaya"

Personnel
 Rachid Taha: vocals, arrangements 
 Steve Hillage: producer, programming, electric and acoustic guitar 
 Morgan Marchand: programming, additional vocal production 
 Hakim Hamadouche: mandolute, backing vocals
 Miquette Giraudy: backing vocals 
 Guillaume Rossel: drums
 Idris Badarou: bass guitar 
 Stephane Baudet: trumpet
 Rachid Belgacem: percussion 
 Hossam Ramzy: percussion
 Hazem Shahin: oud 
 Mohammed Fouda: ney
 Kemang Kanoute: kora
 Magid Sorour: qanun
 Kadi Bouguenaya: gasbar oranais
 Bruno Maman: electric guitar, additional vocal production
 Tariq Saeed M.E.: Oriental keyboard 
 Osama El Khouly: backing vocals
 Doaa Fawzy: backing vocals 
 Nashwa Essam: backing vocals
 Yolande Brzezinski: backing vocals 
 Cairo String Ensemble: Yania El Moughi: violin, leader; Anwar Mansi: violin; Ebada Mansi: violin; Adel Eskander: violin, backing vocals; Yasser Taha: cello

Source:

Charts

References

External links
Official website
Read an album review of Diwân 2 at Allaboutjazz.com

2006 albums
Albums produced by Steve Hillage
Rachid Taha albums